Carayon is a surname. Notable people with the surname include:

Auguste Carayon (1813–1874), French Roman Catholic writer
Bernard Carayon (born 1957), French politician
Christophe Carayon, French paralympic athlete
Jacques Carayon (1916–1997), French entomologist